Staatsanwalt Posch ermittelt was a pseudo-documentary series that aired on RTL 2007/2008.

The series was situated in Cologne and surrounding areas. The first season consisted of 132 one-hour episodes. The first 95 shows aired from 5 February 2007 to 22 June 2007. Reruns of 40 different episodes aired from 25 June 2007 to 17 August 2007; episodes 96-132 ran from 20 August 2007 to 12 October 2007.

The second season aired beginning on 19 November 2007, with 42 half-hour episodes. Its last episode initially aired on 18 April 2008.

See also
List of German television series

References

External links
 

2007 German television series debuts
2008 German television series endings
German-language television shows
RTL (German TV channel) original programming